Metropolitan Park is a waterfront park in Jacksonville, Florida, U.S.

Metropolitan Park may also refer to:
Metropolitan Park (New York City), a former baseball ground in New York City
Metropolitan Natural Park, a park in Panama City, Panama
Metropolitan Park Station, a station of the Kaohsiung MRT in Kaohsiung, Taiwan
Hellenikon Metropolitan Park, an unfinished development project in Athens, Greece
Santiago Metropolitan Park, an urban park in Santiago, Chile